Antony's Parthian War was a military campaign by Mark Antony, the eastern triumvir of the Roman Republic, against the Parthian Empire under Phraates IV.

Julius Caesar had planned an invasion of Parthia but was assassinated before he could implement it. In 40 BC, the Parthians were joined by Pompeian forces and briefly captured much of the Roman East, but a force sent by Antony defeated them and reversed their gains.

Allying with several kingdoms, including Armenia, Antony began a campaign against Parthia with a massive force in 36 BC. The Euphrates front was found to be strong and so Antony chose the route via Armenia. Upon entering Atropatene, the Roman baggage train and siege engines, which had taken a different route, were destroyed by a Parthian cavalry force. Antony still besieged the Atropatene capital but was unsuccessful.

The arduous journey of retreat to Armenia and then Syria further inflicted heavy losses on his force. Roman sources blame the Armenian king for the heavy defeat, but modern sources note Antony's poor management and planning. Antony later invaded and pillaged Armenia and executed its king.

The war became a strategic draw, and peace was later negotiated by Augustus.

Background

Julius Caesar, after ensuring victory in his civil war, planned a campaign into the Parthian Empire in 44 BC to avenge the earlier defeat of a Roman army led by Marcus Licinius Crassus at the Battle of Carrhae. Caesar's plan was, after a brief pacification of Dacia, to continue east into Parthian territory. After his assassination, the Second Triumvirate was formed with Marcus Antonius (Antony), Marcus Lepidus and Gaius Octavianus (later known as Augustus). Soon, with the triumvirs preoccupied with the revolt of Sextus Pompey in Sicily, Parthia attacked Roman-controlled Syria and the client kingdom of Judea.

The Judean high priest and puppet Roman ruler, Hyrcanus II, was overthrown and sent as prisoner to Seleucia, and the pro-Parthian Hasmonean Antigonus was installed in his place.  Antigonus was the only remaining son of the former King Aristobulus II, whom the Romans deposed and installed the weaker Hyrcanus II as high priest (but not king) in 63 BC. Upon capturing Hyrcanus II, Antigonus bit off his uncle's ears to disqualify him from ever serving as high priest again.

In Anatolia, the Parthians allied with Quintus Labienus, son of Caesar's former general and later antagonist Titus Labienus, and penetrated deep into the west and defeated a Roman army under Decidius Saxa. They were, however, defeated by a veteran army, led by Publius Ventidius Bassus, which drove the invaders from Roman territory.

With the aid of Mark Antony, a lover of Egyptian Ptolemaic Queen Cleopatra VII, the son-in-law of Hyrcanus, Herod, returned to Judea and recaptured Jerusalem in 37 BC.

Campaign
In 36 BC, Antony went on to attack the Parthian Empire. Having 16 legions (about 80,000 men), he joined with forces from the client kingdoms of Galatia, Cappadocia, Pontus and Armenia (7,000 infantry and 6,000 heavy cavalry). Cleopatra accompanied Antony as far as the city of Zeugma, where he drew together the army.

As the Parthians were concentrated on the Euphrates, Antony chose the route via Armenia towards Atropatene. From there, Antony and the bulk of the force took the convenient caravan route. The baggage train, which was protected by two legions under legatus Oppius Statianus and accompanied by King Artavasdes II of Armenia, took a different longer route. After entering Atropatene, the latter convoy was attacked by a Parthian cavalry force under Monaeses. Statianus and 10,000 legionaries were killed and the Antony's supplies and siege engines were destroyed. King Polemon I of Pontus was captured, but King Artavasdes II and his cavalry had hastily retreated and did not engage.

The retreat of the Armenian king was later interpreted as treason in Antony's camp. However, a pro-Antony bias is present in the narrations of the campaign by Strabo and Plutarch, whose primary source was a written report by Antony's friend, Quintus Dellius, who had masked Antony's poor management and put the blames on the Armenian king.

Antony still proceeded to besiege the fortified Atropatenian capital Phraata/Praaspa (identified as either Maragheh or less probably Ganzak/Takht-e Soleyman). Ceaselessly harassed by the Parthian and Atropatenian cavalry, Antony finally abandoned the siege and realised his defeat.

Antony then began an exhausting retreat along a mountainous road and was ceaselessly harassed by the Parthian cavalry until his forces reached the border of Armenia Major after 27 days. A survey of the troops suggested 24,000 men were lost.

In Armenia, Antony hid his resentment of the Armenian king and his intentions to punish him in the future, as he needed support to continue his journey through Armenia back to the Roman soil in Syria. The arduous journey through the mountains of Armenia in winter greatly reduced the strength of Antony's army. Around 32,000 men of his army were lost in total.

Aftermath

Again with Egyptian money, Antony invaded Armenia, this time successfully. On his return to Egypt, the equivalent of a Roman triumph was celebrated in the streets of Alexandria.  At the end of the celebration, the whole city was summoned to hear a very important political statement. Later known as the Donations of Alexandria, the political statement effectively ended Antony's alliance with Octavian.

Parthian King Phraates IV was unable to follow up the victory because of a civil war from 32 BC to 25 BC. It began by a rebellion of Tiridates that was probably supported by aristocratic circles and the Romans.

See also
Fabian strategy

References

Roman–Parthian Wars
1st century BC in the Roman Republic
1st century BC in Iran
Parthia
Wars involving Iran
Wars involving Armenia
Cleopatra
40s BC conflicts
Wars involving the Parthian Empire
36 BC
Atropatene
Kingdom of Pontus